Maria Canals may refer to:
 Maria Canals-Barrera née Canals, American actress
 Maria Canals (pianist), Catalan pianist